Bennetts is a specialist insurance broker for motorcycles  headquartered in Peterborough, with a contact centre in Coventry, England, owned by Saga plc.

On 17 February 2020, it was announced that The Ardonagh Group had agreed to purchase Bennetts from Saga for £26 million.

History 
Bennetts was founded by Frederick J Bennett in 1930 in Coventry and initially provided general insurance services for customers in the West Midlands. By the early 1980s it focussed solely on providing insurance to motorcyclists. But in the autumn of 2022, the company began offering car insurance, too.

In 2000, Bennetts launched a quote and buy on-line facility. It was acquired by the BGL Group in 2001.

In 2011, the company launched acommercial portal dedicated to  motorcycling, followed in 2012 by a social networking group, Bike Social.

On 28 January 2015, it was announced that Saga Group was to purchase Bennetts from BGL Group for a reported £26.26m, completed on 1 July 2015. On 1 December 2019, Bennetts stopped trading through Saga Services Limited, changing to Bennetts Motorcycling Services Limited, remaining part of the Saga group of companies.

Administration fees 
Bennetts is a broker. As a broker fees act as a way to maintain business, without this the company could not function. A full explanation of their fees can be found in the policy documents on the website www.Bennetts.co.uk

Sponsorships 
Bennetts is very active in sponsorship of motorcycle championships, race teams, events and individual racers, being the title sponsor of the British Superbike Championship for the 2018-2020 seasons, and previously between 2005 and 2008.

Bennetts is also the official insurance partner to the Isle of Man TT Races, along with being title sponsor of the Isle of Man Classic TT races, and the headline sponsor of the Isle of Man Lightweight TT race. The company is also a personal sponsor of Isle of Man TT racer John McGuinness.

Previously, Bennetts has been title sponsor of the Suzuki team in the British Superbike Championship, a personal sponsor of rider Scott Redding, and young rider Rory Skinner.

Bennetts Travel is backing long-distance motorcyclist and author Nick Sanders.

See also 
 Comparethemarket.com
 Saga plc

References

External links
 The Bennetts Website

Insurance companies of the United Kingdom
Financial services companies established in 1930
1930 establishments in England